DALL-E (stylized as DALL·E) and DALL-E 2 are deep learning models developed by OpenAI to generate digital images from natural language descriptions, called "prompts". DALL-E was revealed by OpenAI in a blog post in January 2021, and uses a version of GPT-3 modified to generate images. In April 2022, OpenAI announced DALL-E 2, a successor designed to generate more realistic images at higher resolutions that "can combine concepts, attributes, and styles".

OpenAI has not released source code for either model. On 20 July 2022, DALL-E 2 entered into a beta phase with invitations sent to 1 million waitlisted individuals; users can generate a certain number of images for free every month and may purchase more. Access had previously been restricted to pre-selected users for a research preview due to concerns about ethics and safety. On 28 September 2022, DALL-E 2 was opened to anyone and the waitlist requirement was removed.

In early November 2022, OpenAI released DALL-E 2 as an API, allowing developers to integrate the model into their own applications. Microsoft unveiled their implementation of DALL-E 2 in their Designer app and Image Creator tool included in Bing and Microsoft Edge. CALA and Mixtiles are among other early adopters of the DALL-E 2 API. The API operates on a cost per image basis, with prices varying depending on image resolution. Volume discounts are available to companies working with OpenAI’s enterprise team.

The software's name is a portmanteau of the names of animated robot Pixar character WALL-E and the Spanish surrealist artist Salvador Dalí.

Technology 
The Generative Pre-trained Transformer (GPT) model was initially developed by OpenAI in 2018, using a Transformer architecture. The first iteration, GPT, was scaled up to produce GPT-2 in 2019; in 2020 it was scaled up again to produce GPT-3, with 175 billion parameters. DALL-E's model is a multimodal implementation of GPT-3 with 12 billion parameters which "swaps text for pixels", trained on text-image pairs from the Internet. DALL-E 2 uses 3.5 billion parameters, a smaller number than its predecessor.

DALL-E was developed and announced to the public in conjunction with CLIP (Contrastive Language-Image Pre-training). CLIP is a separate model based on zero-shot learning that was trained on 400 million pairs of images with text captions scraped from the Internet. Its role is to "understand and rank" DALL-E's output by predicting which caption from a list of 32,768 captions randomly selected from the dataset (of which one was the correct answer) is most appropriate for an image. This model is used to filter a larger initial list of images generated by DALL-E to select the most appropriate outputs.

DALL-E 2 uses a diffusion model conditioned on CLIP image embeddings, which, during inference, are generated from CLIP text embeddings by a prior model.

Capabilities 
DALL-E can generate imagery in multiple styles, including photorealistic imagery, paintings, and emoji. It can "manipulate and rearrange" objects in its images, and can correctly place design elements in novel compositions without explicit instruction. Thom Dunn writing for BoingBoing remarked that "For example, when asked to draw a daikon radish blowing its nose, sipping a latte, or riding a unicycle, DALL-E often draws the handkerchief, hands, and feet in plausible locations." DALL-E showed the ability to "fill in the blanks" to infer appropriate details without specific prompts, such as adding Christmas imagery to prompts commonly associated with the celebration, and appropriately-placed shadows to images that did not mention them. Furthermore, DALL-E exhibits a broad understanding of visual and design trends.

DALL-E can produce images for a wide variety of arbitrary descriptions from various viewpoints with only rare failures. Mark Riedl, an associate professor at the Georgia Tech School of Interactive Computing, found that DALL-E could blend concepts (described as a key element of human creativity).

Its visual reasoning ability is sufficient to solve Raven's Matrices (visual tests often administered to humans to measure intelligence).

Given an existing image, DALL-E 2 can produce "variations" of the image as individual outputs based on the original and edit the image to modify or expand upon it. DALL-E 2's "inpainting" and "outpainting" use context from an image to fill in missing areas using a medium consistent with the original, following a given prompt. For example, this can be used to insert a new subject into an image, or expand an image beyond its original borders. According to OpenAI, "Outpainting takes into account the image’s existing visual elements — including shadows, reflections, and textures — to maintain the context of the original image."

Ethical concerns 
DALL-E 2's reliance on public datasets influences its results and leads to algorithmic bias in some cases, such as generating higher numbers of men than women for requests that do not mention gender. DALL-E 2's training data was filtered to remove violent and sexual imagery, but this was found to increase bias in some cases such as reducing the frequency of women being generated. OpenAI hypothesize that this may be because women were more likely to be sexualized in training data which caused the filter to influence results. In September 2022, OpenAI confirmed to The Verge that DALL-E invisibly inserts phrases into user prompts to address bias in results; for instance, "black man" and "Asian woman" are inserted into prompts that do not specify gender or race.

A concern about DALL-E 2 and similar image generation models is that they could be used to propagate deepfakes and other forms of misinformation. As an attempt to mitigate this, the software rejects prompts involving public figures and uploads containing human faces. Prompts containing potentially objectionable content are blocked, and uploaded images are analyzed to detect offensive material. A disadvantage of prompt-based filtering is that it is easy to bypass using alternative phrases that result in a similar output. For example, the word "blood" is filtered, but "ketchup" and "red liquid" are not.

Another concern about DALL-E 2 and similar models is that they could cause technological unemployment for artists, photographers, and graphic designers due to their accuracy and popularity.

Technical limitations 
DALL-E 2's language understanding has limits. It is sometimes unable to distinguish "A yellow book and a red vase" from "A red book and a yellow vase" or "A panda making latte art" from "Latte art of a panda". It generates images of "an astronaut riding a horse" when presented with the prompt "a horse riding an astronaut". It also fails to generate the correct images in a variety of circumstances. Requesting more than three objects, negation, numbers, and connected sentences may result in mistakes, and object features may appear on the wrong object. Additional limitations include handling text - which, even with legible lettering, almost invariably results in dream-like gibberish - and its limited capacity to address scientific information, such as astronomy or medical imagery.

Reception 

Most coverage of DALL-E focuses on a small subset of "surreal" or "quirky" outputs. DALL-E's output for "an illustration of a baby daikon radish in a tutu walking a dog" was mentioned in pieces from Input, NBC, Nature, and other publications. Its output for "an armchair in the shape of an avocado" was also widely covered.

ExtremeTech stated "you can ask DALL-E for a picture of a phone or vacuum cleaner from a specified period of time, and it understands how those objects have changed". Engadget also noted its unusual capacity for "understanding how telephones and other objects change over time".

According to MIT Technology Review, one of OpenAI's objectives was to "give language models a better grasp of the everyday concepts that humans use to make sense of things".

Wall Street investors have had a positive reception of DALL-E 2, with some firms thinking it could represent a turning point for a future multi-trillion dollar industry. OpenAI has already received over $1 billion  in funding from Microsoft and Khosla Ventures.

Japan's anime community has had a negative reaction to DALL-E 2 and similar models. Two arguments are typically presented by artists against the software. The first is that AI art is not art because it is not created by a human with intent. "The juxtaposition of AI-generated images with their own work is degrading and undermines the time and skill that goes into their art. AI-driven image generation tools have been heavily criticized by artists because they are trained on human-made art scraped from the web." The second is the trouble with copyright law and data text-to-image models are trained on. OpenAI has not released information about what dataset(s) were used to train DALL-E 2, inciting concern from some that the work of artists has been used for training without permission. Copyright laws surrounding these topics are inconclusive at the moment.

Open-source implementations 
There have been several attempts to create open-source implementations of DALL-E. Released in 2022 on Hugging Face's Spaces platform, Craiyon (formerly DALL-E Mini until a name change was requested by OpenAI in June 2022) is an AI model based on the original DALL-E that was trained on unfiltered data from the Internet. It attracted substantial media attention in mid-2022 after its release due to its capacity for producing humorous imagery.

See also
 15.ai
 Artificial intelligence art
 Crungus
 DeepDream
 Imagen (Google Brain)
 Midjourney
 Stable Diffusion
 Prompt engineering
 Synthography

References

External links

DALL E 2 website
Craiyon website

Text-to-image generation
Deep learning software applications
Unsupervised learning
OpenAI